The 2005 Montana State Bobcats football team was an American football team that represented Montana State University in the Big Sky Conference during the 2005 NCAA Division I-AA football season. Montana State ranked No. 18 in final I-AA poll by The Sports Network.

Schedule

References

Montana State
Montana State Bobcats football seasons
Big Sky Conference football champion seasons
Montana State Bobcats football